Coles Point is an unincorporated community in Westmoreland County, in the Commonwealth of Virginia. Coles Point is part of the Northern Neck of Virginia and lies on a peninsula which juts out into the Potomac River on its East side and as part of Westmoreland County waterfront, it follows the Potomac River northward. It is on the Virginia side of the Potomac, and faces St. Mary's County, Maryland.    The ZIP Code for Coles Point is 22442.

References

Unincorporated communities in Virginia
Unincorporated communities in Westmoreland County, Virginia